Concord School House may refer to:
 Concord School House (Arkansas)
 Concord School House (Philadelphia), Pennsylvania